Stan Wawrinka was the three-time defending champion, but chose to compete in Brisbane instead.

Roberto Bautista Agut won the title, defeating Daniil Medvedev in the final, 6–3, 6–4.

Seeds
The top four seeds received a bye into the second round.

Draw

Finals

Top half

Bottom half

Qualifying

Seeds

Qualifiers

Qualifying draw

First qualifier

Second qualifier

Third qualifier

Fourth qualifier

References
 Main Draw
 Qualifying Draw

Singles
2017 ATP World Tour
Maharashtra Open